Bərgüşad is a village and municipality in the Ujar District of Azerbaijan. It has a population of 5,803.

Notable natives 
 Habibi (poet) - 15th and 16th centuries Azerbaijani poet

References 

Populated places in Ujar District